The Jamaican petrel (Pterodroma caribbaea) is a small possibly extinct seabird in the gadfly petrel genus, Pterodroma. It is related to the black-capped petrel (P. hasitata).

Conservation
This species was last collected in 1879, and was searched for without success between 1996 and 2000. However, it cannot yet be classified as extinct because nocturnal petrels are notoriously difficult to record, and it may still occur on Dominica and Guadeloupe. If it is extinct, the most likely cause is due to predation by introduced mongooses and rats.

Parasites
Several species of lice are known to have parasitized the Jamaica and black-capped petrels. If the former is extinct, one of these lice, the phtilopterid Saemundssonia jamaicensis may be coextinct, as it has not been found on other birds.

References

Mey, Eberhard (1990): Eine neue ausgestorbene Vogel-Ischnozere von Neuseeland, Huiacola extinctus (Insecta, Phthiraptera). Zoologischer Anzeiger 224(1/2): 49–73. [German with English abstract] PDF fulltext

External links
BirdLife species factsheet

Jamaican petrel
Birds of Jamaica
Endemic birds of the Caribbean
Jamaican petrel
Jamaican petrel